Dennis Hauger (born 17 March 2003) is a Norwegian racing driver currently competing in the 2023 FIA Formula 2 Championship with MP Motorsport. He is a member of the Red Bull Junior Team and the 2021 FIA Formula 3 champion. He also won the 2019 Italian F4 Championship with Van Amersfoort Racing.

Career

Karting
Hauger was born in Oslo and raised in Aurskog. His parents bought him a quad bike when he was two, and he started driving cross bikes at the age of four. He began his karting career at the age of five, winning his first race at the age of eight. After finishing 62 out of 70 national races on the podium the Norwegian moved into international competition in 2014. That year Hauger claimed the ROK International title in the Mini category and followed it up the following year by claiming Mini category titles in the Vega Winter Trophy, the Italian CSAI Karting Championship and the WSK Champions Cup and Super Masters championships. In 2017, Hauger became the youngest ever champion to claim the DKM junior title and repeated this feat the following year to become the youngest DKM champion, until Harry Thompson claimed the title in 2018.

Lower formulae
In October 2017, Hauger and fellow Red Bull junior Jack Doohan were signed by the TRS Arden Junior Team to contest the 2018 F4 British Championship. Claiming four victories, Hauger ended the season fourth in the overall standings, but missed out on the Junior Championship to Doohan.

The following year, Hauger remained at Formula 4 level, but switched to Van Amersfoort Racing to contest the ADAC and Italian F4 championships. In the ADAC championship, Hauger claimed six victories, including one at the Formula One support race at the Hockenheimring, and finished as championship runner-up to Théo Pourchaire by only seven points.

Over in the Italian championship, Hauger scored twelve victories, including a weekend grand slam in the season finale at Monza, and sealed the title with a round to spare, being over 130 points ahead of fellow F1 junior drivers Gianluca Petecof of Ferrari and Paul Aron of Mercedes. His performances also helped Van Amersfoort Racing to win the team championship.

Euroformula Open Championship

In August 2019, Motopark announced Hauger would make his debut in the championship at Silverstone replacing Liam Lawson, having had to wait a round due to clashes with ADAC Formula 4 at the Red Bull Ring. The race weekend saw Hauger take a sixth-place finish in the first race and a fifth-place finish in the second race.

FIA Formula 3 Championship

2020 
In October 2019, Hauger partook in the second and third days of post-season testing in Valencia with Hitech Grand Prix. In January 2020, Red Bull confirmed Hauger would race with the British outfit in the upcoming season together with fellow Red Bull junior Liam Lawson and Renault junior Max Fewtrell. Hauger's first FIA Formula 3 points came at the Hungaroring, where he finished eighth in the first race. This put him on reverse-grid pole position for the second race. He led much of the race but dropped back when the track began to dry, finishing third to claim his maiden FIA Formula 3 podium finish. Despite this result, Hauger would fail to score points at any of the remaining races, eventually finishing 17th in the championship with 14 points.

In the post-season test at Catalunya, Hauger joined reigning team champions Prema Racing and consistently ran in the top ten across both testing days with a best placed finish of third in both afternoon sessions. Later that month, the Italian outfit once again fielded Hauger in the second post-season test at Jerez.

2021 

In December, Prema confirmed Hauger would race with them in the 2021 season, partnering Olli Caldwell and Ferrari Driver Academy member Arthur Leclerc. He scored his first pole position in the category at the first weekend in Barcelona, beating former British F4 rival Jack Doohan. Hauger fought for the lead of Race 2 with Matteo Nannini, however the two collided, breaking Hauger's front wing and dropping him to the back. He led the entirety of Race 3 to claim his first FIA Formula 3 race victory, and ended the first round leading the championship by two points over teammate Caldwell. Hauger took consecutive second-place finishes at the Circuit Paul Ricard before taking pole position at the Red Bull Ring and finishing all three races on the podium, including a victory in Race 1 after starting 12th. After the third round, his championship lead had extended to a margin of 41 points, and Hauger extended that gap to 63 points after winning a wet-weather race at the Hungaroring. Following a round at Spa-Francorchamps in which the Norwegian only scored six points however, his title rival Jack Doohan was able to bridge the gap between the two going into the penultimate round of the season. Hauger lost a chance at a podium finish three laps from the end of race two at Zandvoort due to a collision with Ido Cohen, but he was able to bounce back in the final race, extending his gap once again with his fourth win of the year. In the first race of the final round at the Sochi Autodrom, the Norwegian came up from fourth on the grid to take second, thus becoming the 2021 Formula 3 Champion with two races to spare. After the race, he stated that he had "started questioning [himself]" the previous season, but that his doubts were eradicated following his move to Prema.

Following the season finale, Hauger drove an F3 development car in a tyre test in Barcelona, completing 123 laps on a dry track, with the goals of the session being to make racing in F3 more demanding, as well as developing the tyres to help the teams for the following season.

FIA Formula 2 Championship

2022 

Having tested with the team at the end of 2021, Hauger announced on 14 January that he would be partnering Jehan Daruvala at Prema Racing in Formula 2. He had a shaky start in the first round in Bahrain, finishing just out of the points in 9th place in the Sprint Race. In the Feature Race, he was running in 9th place before retiring following a pit stop blunder which caused his front left tire to detach and roll down the pit lane. In Jeddah's Sprint Race, Hauger started on reverse grid pole before a Safety Car communication confusion saw him served a 10-second stop-and-go penalty. He finished in 16th place. For the Feature Race, he scored his first points of the season after finishing sixth.

Hauger's Imola weekend was bittersweet; he scored his maiden Formula 2 podium after finishing 3rd in the Sprint Race, but was involved in an early collision with Jack Doohan that saw his Feature Race over after 3 turns. His weekend in Barcelona was uneventful; he qualified 14th and finished 12th in the Sprint Race and 13th in the Feature Race. He bounced back for a strong showing in Monaco. He qualified 9th after several grid penalties being applied for other drivers. He started second on reverse grid for the Sprint Race and led from start to finish to score his maiden F2 victory. In the Feature Race, he made up 4 places at the start to 5th position. His race was slightly compromised by a Safety Car and he finished in 7th.

Hauger secured his best qualifying yet in Baku with third position. He crashed out of the Sprint Race when he suffered a huge lock up and ran nose first into the wall, but he redeemed himself by winning his first Feature Race the next day. He qualified 12th in Silverstone and finished in 15th place in the Sprint Race. He retired in the Feature Race after a collision with Roy Nissany. In Austria, he qualified in 15th position, but managed to finish 9th in the Sprint Race. He began the Feature Race on slick tyres which saw him pass multiple drivers who were on wets as the track dried; he eventually finished fourth after a string of drivers received penalties.

Hauger's qualifying woes continued in France when a fuel pump failure prevented him from putting in more laps, as a result, he qualified 18th. He finished 12th and 16th in the Sprint and Feature races respectively. He qualified eighth in Hungary which saw him start third on reverse grid for the Sprint Race, but was involved in a collision with Logan Sargeant which saw his race over at Turn 1. He finished 19th in the Feature Race after massive tyre degradation which saw him pit twice. In Spa, his practice was cut short after an oil leak. He later qualified 11th. During the Sprint Race, he took a gamble to pit for soft tyres during a Safety Car and finished 10th. After he incurred two five-second penalties, he classified as 12th in the Feature Race.

Hauger had a successful weekend at Zandvoort, where he qualified seventh and finished third and fourth in the Sprint and Feature Races respectively. He had a poor qualifying in Monza, but had the pace to make up 10 places to finish ninth, as well as earn a fastest lap in the Sprint Race. In the Feature Race, he made up 15 places to finish fourth in an incident-packed race. He also had to serve a drive-through penalty in the early part of the race for his team's failure to fit his wheels at the three minute signal before the start. In the final race weekend of the season in Abu Dhabi, he put on a strong showing by qualifying seventh on the grid. He finished fourth in the Sprint and Feature Races respectively, and ended the 2022 season in 10th place overall.

2023 
In 2023, Hauger is set to switch to MP Motorsport for the 2023 Formula 2 Championship.

Formula One
In September 2017, Hauger was named as one of four new signings to the Red Bull Junior Team. He was announced as one of four reserve drivers for the Red Bull Racing Formula One team in 2023.

Personal life 
Hauger has carried a lucky amulet, which he received from his grandmother, around his neck since he started competing in international karting competitions.

Karting record

Karting career summary

Complete CIK-FIA Karting European Championship results 
(key) (Races in bold indicate pole position) (Races in italics indicate fastest lap)

Complete Karting World Championship results

Racing record

Racing career summary 
 
† As Hauger was a guest driver, he was ineligible to score points.
* Season still in progress.

Complete F4 British Championship results
(key) (Races in bold indicate pole position) (Races in italics indicate fastest lap)

Complete Italian F4 Championship results
(key) (Races in bold indicate pole position) (Races in italics indicate fastest lap)

Complete ADAC Formula 4 Championship results
(key) (Races in bold indicate pole position) (Races in italics indicate fastest lap)

Complete Formula Regional European Championship results
(key) (Races in bold indicate pole position) (Races in italics indicate fastest lap)

Complete FIA Formula 3 Championship results
(key) (Races in bold indicate pole position; races in italics indicate points for the fastest lap of top ten finishers)

† Driver did not finish the race, but was classified as they completed more than 90% of the race distance.

Complete FIA Formula 2 Championship results 
(key) (Races in bold indicate pole position) (Races in italics indicate points for the fastest lap of top ten finishers)

† Driver did not finish the race, but was classified as they completed more than 90% of the race distance.
* Season still in progress.

References

External links 
 
 

Living people
2003 births
Sportspeople from Oslo
Norwegian racing drivers
Place of birth missing (living people)
ADAC Formula 4 drivers
British F4 Championship drivers
Italian F4 Championship drivers
Italian F4 champions
Euroformula Open Championship drivers
FIA Formula 3 Championship drivers
FIA Formula 2 Championship drivers
Formula Regional European Championship drivers
Arden International drivers
Van Amersfoort Racing drivers
Motopark Academy drivers
Hitech Grand Prix drivers
Prema Powerteam drivers
FIA Formula 3 Champions
Karting World Championship drivers
Porsche Motorsports drivers